Jemieliste  is a village in the administrative district of Gmina Filipów, within Suwałki County, Podlaskie Voivodeship, in north-eastern Poland.

The village has an approximate population of 180.

References

Jemieliste